Nils Gustav Herman Lundgren (born 13 July 1936, in Skövde) is a Swedish politician and economist, who is a former Member of the European Parliament (MEP). Between 2004 and 2008 he was the leader of the eurosceptical June List, which he had co-founded.

He was elected to the European Parliament in 2004 and was a member of the bureau of the Independence and Democracy group, and vice-chair of the European Parliament's Committee on Budgetary Control.  He was also a member of the Committee on Industry, Research and Energy, a substitute for the Committee on Economic and Monetary Affairs, and a member of the delegation to the EU–Turkey Joint Parliamentary Committee.  He did not stand for re-election as a MEP in the 2009 elections.

Education
 Doctorate in economics from Stockholm University (1975)

Career
 University lecturer in economics, Stockholm (1962-1963)
 Economics expert at EFTA secretariat in Geneva (1964-1965)
 Research at Institute for International Economic Studies, Stockholm (1966-1971)
 Researcher, Ministry of Industry (1971-1974)
 Guest researcher, Reading University (1975)
 Head of research unit, National Institute of Economic Research (1977-1979)
 Chief economist, PK-banken subsequently Nordbanken subsequently MeritaNordbanken (1980-1999)
 Economic adviser Nordea (1999-2001)
 Member of the Royal Swedish Academy of Engineering Sciences since 1988.
 Artillery reserve officer
 Previously chairman and member of the Board of a number of Swedish and international companies and organisations
 Editor-in-chief of Ekonomisk debatt
 Integration i Västeuropa (Integration in Western Europe) (1974), Industripolitikens spelregler (Industrial policy - the rules of the game) (1981) and Europa ja - euro nej (Yes to Europe - no to the euro) (2003), as well as a number of other books, publications and articles

References

External links
European Parliament biography

1936 births
Living people
Swedish economists
June List politicians
Leaders of political parties in Sweden
Members of the Royal Swedish Academy of Engineering Sciences
June List MEPs
MEPs for Sweden 2004–2009